Taja Sevelle (born Nancy Richardson) is an American singer and songwriter, best known for her 1987 single, "Love Is Contagious" and for the non-profit organization Urban Farming, which she founded in 2005.

Biography
Sevelle signed a recording contract with Prince's Paisley Park Records in 1987. She also released her self-titled debut album that year, and would go on to release two more studio albums on other labels, 1991's Fountains Free and 1997's Toys of Vanity. Only two of the songs she recorded were written or co-written by Prince: "Wouldn't You Love to Love Me?" and "If I Could Get Your Attention", both from her debut album.

She was first featured on Prince and the Revolution's 1985 album Around the World in a Day, singing backing vocals on the song "The Ladder".

During the 1990s, Sevelle wrote several songs for Warner Music.

Debut album
The eponymous album Taja Sevelle was produced by Minneapolis musician Chico Bennett. She mainly worked with Warner Bros. executives on the album. It failed to chart in the US, but reached number 48 in the UK and number 52 in the Netherlands.

Urban Farming
In 2005, Taja founded the non-profit organization Urban Farming. Its mission is "to create an abundance of food for people in need by supporting and encouraging the establishment of gardens on unused land and space while increasing diversity, raising awareness for health and wellness, and inspiring and educating youth, adults and seniors to create an economically sustainable system to uplift communities around the globe."

The organization began by planting three gardens of free food in Detroit and there are now over 63,400 gardens in 61 countries around the world that are a part of the Urban Farming Global Food Chain.

Discography

Albums

Studio albums

Extended plays

Singles

Music videos

References

External links
 Official website
 
 
 

1962 births
American contemporary R&B singers
Paisley Park Records artists
Musicians from Minneapolis
Living people
Songwriters from Minnesota
Singers from Minnesota
Reprise Records artists
550 Music artists
Epic Records artists